The following is a list of universities and colleges in Hebei.

See also
Oriental University City

References
List of Chinese Higher Education Institutions — Ministry of Education
List of Chinese universities, including official links
Hebei Institutions Admitting International Students

 
Hebei